The fern genus Asplenium is well known for its hybridization capacity, especially in temperate zones.

Appalachian Asplenium hybrid complex

The Appalachian hybrid complex in Asplenium is a polyploid complex composed of 3 diploid species, 3 allotetraploid species formed by hybridisation and chromosome doubling from the former, and assorted diploid, triploid and tetraploid hybrids between the 6 species.

The three diploid parent species are mountain spleenwort (Asplenium montanum), ebony spleenwort (Asplenium platyneuron), and American walking fern (Asplenium rhizophyllum). Their chromosome complements are abbreviated "MM", "PP" and "RR", respectively. Three possible sterile diploid hybrids can form from their hybridization:
A. montanum × platyneuron (MP) has been collected on very rare occasions.
A. montanum × rhizophyllum (MR) is theorized to exist, but has never been collected.
A. platyneuron × rhizophyllum (PR) is known as Scott's spleenwort (Asplenium × ebenoides) and is relatively common.
In addition, A. platyneuron and A. rhizophyllum, which have a more extensive range, hybridize with other spleenwort species outside the Appalachian complex.

At some point in the past, each of the sterile diploid hybrids experienced a chromosome doubling event that made them fertile allotetraploids; allozyme analysis shows that this happened on several independent occasions for A. montanum × platyneuron and A. montanum × rhizophyllum. These doubling events gave rise to the following tetraploids:

Since these allotetraploids are fertile, they are capable of crossing with each other and with the three diploid species to form the following sterile triploid and tetraploid hybrids, most of which are quite rare and occur sporadically where their parents' ranges overlap:

New Zealand hybrids
19 hybrids within the genus have been described from New Zealand, but have not been given binomials.

Other hybrid species
Asplenium afghanicum (Asplenium dolomiticum × A. lepidum var. haussknechtii)
Asplenium azoricum  (A. anceps × ?)
Asplenium × biscayneanum (Asplenium dentatum × A. verecundum)
Asplenium × curtissii (Asplenium abscissum × A. verecundum)
Asplenium majoricum (A. fontanum × A. petrarchae)
Asplenium reuteri (Asplenium lepidum × A. trichomanes)

Hybrid plants